Lawyers Law Books: A Practical Index to Legal Literature is a bibliography of law. The First Edition was by John Rees and Donald Raistrick. The Second and Third were by the latter author alone.

First Edition
The First Cumulative Supplement to this Edition was published in 1979.

Second Edition
Hines said this book might be the "most noteworthy" of the more recent general legal bibliographies. McVeigh praised it for its succinctness and called it "the best starting point".

Third Edition
The preface to this edition is dated August 1996. This Edition does not include books published before 1980 unless the author considered them to be "useful". Finch and Fafinski said that this book is "extremely useful". Holborn called it "excellent".

References
John Rees and Donald Raistrick. Lawyers' Law Books: A Practical Index to Legal Literature. Professional Books. Abingdon. 1977. . Google Books.
Donald Raistrick. Lawyers' Law Books: A Practical Index to Legal Literature. Second Edition. Professional Books. Abingdon. 1985.
Donald Raistrick. Lawyers' Law Books: A Practical Index to Legal Literature. Third Edition. Bowker-Saur. 1997.
The Library Association Record. Library Association. 1979. Volume 81. p 73.
The Law Librarian. British and Irish Association of Law Libraries. 1983. Volumes 14 - 16. p 13.
"Book Reviews" (1977) 8-11 The Law Librarian 14 Google Books
"Book Reviews", 14-16 The Law Librarian 130 at 131; "Current Awareness" at p 58 Google Books
"Book Reviews" (1998) 29 The Law Librarian 124 (2 June, no 2 of vol 29) Google Books
Donald J Dunn. The Noter Up. W S Hein. 1985. Page 7. Google Books
(1984) 3 Legal Information Alert 6 Google Books
"Reviews" (1978) 122 Solicitors Journal 29 (13 January 1978) Google Books
"Reviews" (1985) 129 Solicitors Journal 668 Google Books
"Book Reviews" (1978) Malayan Law Journal cxiv (April 1978) Google Books
"Book Reviews" (1985) Malayan Law Journal 414 (December 1985) Google Books
(1984) 16 American Association of Law Libraries Newsletter 75 Google Books
Sipkov (1979) 6 International Journal of Law Libraries 112 Google Books
Albert John Walford, Alan Day, Marilyn Mullay, Michael Walsh and Priscilla Schlicke. Walford's Guide to Reference Material. Library Association. Eighth Edition. 1999. . Volume 2 (Social and Historical Sciences, Philosophy and Religion). Paragraph 2738 at page 209. Google Books
S P Dyer, "U.K. Legal Bibliography" (1997) 122 Library Journal 144 (August 1997) Google Books
Karen Fullerton and Megan Macgregor. "Legal Bibliographies" in Legal Research Skills for Scots Lawyers. W Green/Sweet & Maxwell. 1999. Para 6.5.2 at page 104. Google Books

Legal bibliographies
1977 non-fiction books